Malenin  is a village in the administrative district of Gmina Tczew, within Tczew County, Pomeranian Voivodeship, in northern Poland. It is located within the ethnocultural region of Kociewie in the historic region of Pomerania.

The village has a population of 389.

History
Malenin was a private church village of the Diocese of Włocławek, administratively located in the Tczew County in the Pomeranian Voivodeship of the Polish Crown.

During the German occupation of Poland (World War II), in 1939 the Germans carried out a massacre of Polish teachers in the village, as part of the Intelligenzaktion.

References

Villages in Tczew County
Nazi war crimes in Poland